Charles Lucien Basle (8 January 1885 Paris – 4 February 1962 Los Angeles, California) was a French racecar driver. Basle did most of his racing in the 1900s and early 1910s. He won a 24 Hour race at Brighton Beach in August 1909. Basle made 9 starts in AAA sanctioned races, including the 1911 International Sweepstakes. After a 10 year break, Basle made a surprise reappearance at the Los Angeles Speedway board track in 1922. His younger brother, Marcel, died in a racing accident at Chicago in June 1911. Charles Basle lived in Los Angeles for many years, where he worked in the auto industry. He eventually operated an auto repair business. He is buried in San Gabriel Mission Cemetery in San Gabriel, California.

Indy 500 results

References

External links

1885 births
1962 deaths
French racing drivers
Indianapolis 500 drivers
French expatriates in the United States